Lori Peek is a professor of Sociology at University of Colorado at Boulder and director of the Natural Hazards Center. Peek has received many awards for her scholarship, her career in teaching, and her service to the discipline of sociology and broader hazards and disaster field. On April 20, 2021 President Joe Biden nominated Peek to be a Member of Board of Directors of the National Institute of Building Sciences, subject to the advice and consent of the Senate.

Background and education 
Peek, who was born and raised in Kansas, completed her K-12 studies in a rural school district in Waverly, Kansas. She then went on to pursue an undergraduate degree in Sociology at Ottawa University in Ottawa, Kansas. During the summer before her senior year, she received an international scholarship to study abroad in England at Nottingham Trent University. She graduated summa cum laude from Ottawa University with her Bachelor of Arts in Sociology in 1997. She then continued her education at Colorado State University where she graduated with a Master of Education in 1999. In 2005, Peek graduated with a Ph.D. in Sociology from the University of Colorado Boulder.

Awards 
Peek has been recognized with many awards for her efforts over the years. Among her most notable awards:

 2016- Outstanding Scholarly Contribution Award for Children of Katrina, American Sociological Association Section on Children and Youth
 2016- Betty and Alfred McClung Lee Book Award for Children of Katrina, Association for Humanist Sociology
 2016- Board of Governor's Excellence in Undergraduate Teaching Award, Colorado State University System
 2015- Ann Gill Excellence in Teaching Award, College of Liberal Arts, Colorado State University
 2013- Best Book Award for Behind the Backlash: Muslim Americans after 9/11, American Sociological Association Section on Altruism, Morality, and Social Solidarity
 2012- President's Award for Volunteer Service, Natural Hazards Mitigation Association
 2011- Choice's Compilation of Significant University Press Titles for Undergraduates, 2010–11, Behind the Backlash: Muslim Americans after 9/11
 2010- Professor of the Year, Colorado State University Greek Life and the Panhellenic Council
 2009- Early Career Award for Outstanding Contributions to Scholarship, American Sociological Association Section on Children and Youth

Key works

Behind the Backlash: Muslim Americans After 9/11 

Behind the Backlash: Muslim Americans After 9/11 (2011) gives voice to Muslim Americans living in post 9/11 America who faced backlash violence and were misrepresented in the media.  This book would go on to win awards such as,  the Distinguished Book Award from the Midwest Sociological Society in 2012, and the Best Book Award from the American Sociological Association in 2013.

Displaced: Life in the Katrina Diaspora 

Peek co-edited Displaced: Life in The Katrina Diaspora (2012) along with fellow sociologist, Dr. Lynn Weber. This book features the work of 12 feminist scholars and follows the lives of hundreds of person who were displaced in the aftermath of Hurricane Katrina. Peek's work in this book focuses on the discrimination that Katrina survivors faced in Colorado after the storm. She also co-authored other chapters in the text focusing on the broader displacement and on children's experiences.

Children of Katrina 

Alice Fothergill and Lori Peek spent seven years after Katrina following a cohort of children and their families who were affected by the storm. Children of Katrina (2015), has been recognized as the Outstanding Scholarly Contribution Award from the American Sociological Association in 2016, and the Betty and Alfred McClung Lee Book Award from the Association for Humanist Sociology in 2016. It was also named a finalist for the Colorado Book Awards in the scholarly non-fiction category.

The Continuing Storm: Learning from Katrina

References

External links 
 

Living people
American sociologists
American women sociologists
Environmental social scientists
Colorado State University faculty
University of Colorado alumni
Colorado State University alumni
Ottawa University alumni
1975 births
21st-century American women